(born 20 February 1983) is a Japanese singer-songwriter.

Discography

Albums

Studio albums

Extended plays

Singles

As lead artist

Promotional singles

Other appearances

See also
List of J-pop artists

References

External links
  Fuyumi Abe Official Website

1983 births
Living people
Japanese women pop singers
Japanese women singer-songwriters
Japanese singer-songwriters
21st-century Japanese singers
21st-century Japanese women singers